Muddu Manase is a 2015 Indian Kannada romance drama film directed by Ananth Shain. It stars Aru Gowda, Nithya Ram and Aishwarya Nag in lead roles, the former two of whom made their debuts with the film. Achyuth Kumar, Padmaja Rao and Padmini Prakash feature in supporting roles. The film tells the story of a love triangle around Suresh (Gowda), and how he goes about dealing with his old lover as he falls in love with another girl in different circumstances and time. The title of the film which translates to "sweet mind", was taken from a track of the 2002 Kannada film Majestic.

The film score and soundtrack were composed by debutante Vineeth Raj Menon, and lyrics for each of the six tracks in the film were penned six directors of Kannada cinema. Upon theatrical release on 28 August 2015, the film received mixed reviews from critics. The film's music, cinematography and the acting performance of Gowda received praise, and the screenplay was criticized.

Cast 
 Aru Gowda as Suresh aka Suri
 Nithya Ram as Poorvi
 Aishwarya Nag afakmd Mouna
 Achyuth Kumar
 Padmaja Rao
 Padmini Prakash as Suresh's mother
 Prakash Kagodu
 Shreya

Soundtrack

The music is composed by debutant Vineeth Raj Menon.

The lyrics have been by penned by 6 prominent directors of Kannada films: Yogaraj Bhat, Shashank, Suni, A. P. Arjun, Santhu and V. Nagendra Prasad. Another well known director Prem (of Jogi fame) has sung a song for this album.

The songs received good reviews and the album has been very well received. The song "Edeyal Yaro Ghazal" came in for special praise because the rarely used word "Kaadhal" (ಕಾದಲ್) was used in a Kannada song for the first time. "Kaadhal" means 'love' in Tamil but is also old Kannada for 'love'. V Nagendra Prasad won the Karnataka State Film Awards for Best Lyricist 2015 for this song.

The music got further praise after release of the movie. Many reviewers considered the music of Vineeth Raj Menon as the highlight of the film.

Reception

Muddu Manase received generally good reviews upon release. Music by Vineeth Raj Menon received praise. Aru Gowda gained notice for his good work in his debut. Director Ananth Shine faced minor criticism for a slow screenplay and lack of comedy in his script. But his story, beautiful shots and earnest effort as a newbie were appreciated. The cinematography by Madhav Salunke also received a nod from critics.

References

External links
 

2010s Kannada-language films
Indian romantic drama films
2015 directorial debut films
2015 films
2015 romantic drama films